The 2017 Wyoming Cowboys football team represented the University of Wyoming during the 2017 NCAA Division I FBS football season. The Cowboys were coached by fourth-year head coach Craig Bohl and played their home games at War Memorial Stadium. They participated in the Mountain Division of the Mountain West Conference. This was their first year with new defensive coordinator Scottie Hazelton, who was previously an NFL linebackers coach with Jacksonville Jaguars for three seasons and was also Bohl's defensive coordinator for two seasons at North Dakota State. They finished the season 8–5, 5–3 in Mountain West play to finish in a tie for second place in the Mountain Division. They were invited to the Famous Idaho Potato Bowl where they defeated Central Michigan.

Previous season
The Cowboys finished the season 8–6 overall (6–2 in Mountain West play). They finished in a three-way tie for the Mountain Division title. After tiebreakers, they represented the Mountain Division in, and hosted, the Mountain West Championship Game where they lost to San Diego State. They were invited to the Poinsettia Bowl where they lost to BYU.

2017 recruiting class
Wyoming signed 23 high school players and one transfer.

Schedule

Personnel

Coaching staff

Roster

Statistics
source:

Team

Offense

Defense

Key: SOLO: Solo Tackles, AST: Assisted Tackles, TOT: Total Tackles, TFL: Tackles-for-loss, SACK: Quarterback Sacks, INT: Interceptions, BU: Passes Broken Up, QBH: Quarterback Hits, FF: Forced Fumbles, FR: Fumbles Recovered, BLK: Kicks or Punts Blocked, SAF: Safeties

Special teams

Scores by quarter (all opponents)

Awards and honors

All-Conference Teams
First Team

Youhanna Ghaifan, So., DL

Carl Granderson, Jr., DL

Andrew Wingard, Jr., DB

Second Team

Logan Wilson, So., LB

Rico Gafford, Sr., DB

Honorable Mention

Josh Allen, Sr., QB

Tyler Hall, So., Ret

Senior Bowls
Josh Allen – Senior Bowl

Rico Gafford – NFLPA Collegiate Bowl

Box Scores

at Iowa

 Passing leaders: Josh Allen (UW): 23–40, 174 YDS, 2 INT; Nate Stanley (IOWA): 8–15, 125 YDS, 3 TD, 1 INT
 Rushing leaders: Milo Hall (UW): 9 CAR, 30 YDS; Akrum Wadley (IOWA): 24 CAR, 116 YDS
 Receiving leaders: Austin Conway (UW): 7 REC, 47 YDS; Nick Easley (IOWA): 4 REC, 77 YDS, 1 TD

Gardner–Webb

 Passing leaders: Josh Allen (UW): 22–32, 328 YDS, 2 TDS; Tyrell Maxwell	(GWU): 2–7, 22 YDS, 1 INT
 Rushing leaders: Kellen Overstreet (UW): 14 CAR, 33 YDS; Tyrell Maxwell (GWU): 18 CAR, 68 YDS
 Receiving leaders: Austin Conway (UW): 11 REC, 135 YDS, 1 TD; James Ellis II (GWU): 1 REC, 12 YDS

Oregon

 Passing leaders: Josh Allen (UW): 9–24, 64 YDS, 1 INT; Justin Herbert (ORE): 18–29, 251 YDS, 1 TD, 1 INT
 Rushing leaders: Milo Hall (UW): 11 CAR, 43 YDS; Royce Freeman (ORE): 30 CAR, 157 YDS, 3 TDS
 Receiving leaders: Austin Conway (UW): 4 REC, 27 YDS; Dillon Mitchell (ORE): 6 REC, 65 YDS

Hawaii

 Passing leaders: Josh Allen (UW): 9–19, 92 YDS, 1 TD; Dru Brown (UH): 29–40, 280 YDS, 1 TD, 2 INT
 Rushing leaders: Trey Woods (UW): 15 CAR, 135 YDS, 1 TD; Diocemy Saint Juste (UH): 26 CAR, 120 YDS, 1 TD
 Receiving leaders: Tyree Mayfield (UW): 2 REC, 27 YDS; John Ursua (UH): 8 REC, 102 YDS, 1 TD

Texas State

 Passing leaders: Josh Allen (UW): 14–24, 219 YDS, 3 TDS; Damian Williams (TSU): 10–19, 91 YDS, 1 TD, 1 INT
 Rushing leaders: Trey Woods (UW): 21 CAR, 53 YDS; Willie Jones III (TSU): 5 CAR, 57 YDS
 Receiving leaders: D.J. Johnson (UW): 4 REC, 57 YDS, 2 TDS; Hutch White (TSU): 2 REC, 42 YDS

at Utah State

 Passing leaders: Josh Allen (UW): 18–26, 208 YDS, 1 TD, 1 INT; Jordan Love (USU): 8–18, 109 YDS, 3 INT
 Rushing leaders: Trey Woods (UW): 15 CAR, 40 YDS; LaJuan Hunt (USU): 18 CAR, 73 YDS
 Receiving leaders: James Price (UW): 4 REC, 72 YDS; Dax Raymond (USU): 5 REC, 72 YDS

at Boise State

 Passing leaders: Josh Allen (UW): 12–27, 131 YDS, 1 TD, 2 INT; Brett Rypien (BSU): 12–17, 104 YDS
 Rushing leaders: Josh Allen (UW): 18 CAR, 62 YDS 1 TD; Alexander Mattison (BSU): 17 CAR, 91 YDS
 Receiving leaders: Austin Conway (UW): 5 REC, 33 YDS; Cedrick Wilson Jr. (BSU): 5 REC, 66 YDS, 1 TD

New Mexico

 Passing leaders: Josh Allen (UW): 16–28, 234 YDS, 4 TD; Tevaka Tuioti (UNM): 8–17, 47 YDS, 3 INT
 Rushing leaders: Trey Woods (UW): 11 CAR, 25 YDS; Richard McQuarley (UNM): 13 CAR, 43 YDS
 Receiving leaders: James Price (UW): 4 REC, 68 YDS; Delane Hart–Johnson (UNM): 1 REC, 17 YDS

Colorado State

 Passing leaders: Josh Allen (UW): 10–20, 138 YDS; Nick Stevens (CSU): 8–14, 110 YDS
 Rushing leaders: Josh Allen (UW): 12 CAR, 60 YDS; Dalyn Dawkins (CSU): 29 CAR, 154 YDS
 Receiving leaders: Austin Conway & C.J. Johnson (UW): 2 REC, 35 YDS; Dalton Fackrell (CSU): 2 REC, 61 YDS

at Air Force

 Passing leaders: Josh Allen (UW): 8–11, 70 YDS, 1 TD; Arion Worthman (AFA): 10–22, 175 YDS, 1 TD, 1 INT
 Rushing leaders:  Trey Woods (UW): 11 CAR, 47 YDS, 1 TD; Taven Birdow (AFA): 19 CAR, 82 YDS, 1 TD
 Receiving leaders: Trey Woods (UW): 1 REC, 38 YDS; Marcus Bennet (AFA): 3 REC, 52 YDS, 1 TD

Fresno State

 Passing leaders: Nick Smith (UW): 20–32, 231 YDS, 1 TD; Marcus McMaryion (FSU): 14–23, 186 YDS, 1 TD
 Rushing leaders:  Kellen Overstreet (UW): 10 CAR, 31 YDS; Josh Hokit (FSU): 21 CAR, 69 YDS
 Receiving leaders: Austin Conway (UW): 7 REC, 105 YDS; KeeSean Johnson (FSU): 6 REC, 48 YDS

at San Jose State

 Passing leaders: Nick Smith (UW): 17–37, 171 YDS, 1 TD, 2 INT; Montel Aaron (SJSU): 15–29, 174 YDS, 1 INT
 Rushing leaders:  Kellen Overstreet (UW): 17 CAR, 139 YDS; DeJon Packer (SJSU): 8 CAR, 75 YDS, 1 TD
 Receiving leaders: C.J. Johnson (UW): 4 REC, 106 YDS, 1 TD; Tre Hartley (SJSU): 7 REC, 109 YDS

vs. Central Michigan–Famous Idaho Potato Bowl

 Passing leaders: Josh Allen (UW): 11–19, 154 YDS, 3 TD; Shane Morris (CMU): 23–39, 329 YDS, 1 TD, 4 INT
 Rushing leaders:  Kellen Overstreet (UW): 21 CAR, 85 YDS; Jonathan Ward (CMU): 12 CAR, 29 YDS, 1 TD
 Receiving leaders: C.J. Johnson (UW): 3 REC, 63 YDS, 1 TD; Jonathan Ward (CMU): 7 REC, 109 YDS, 1 TD

Players in the 2018 NFL draft

References

Wyoming
Wyoming Cowboys football seasons
Famous Idaho Potato Bowl champion seasons
Wyoming Cowboys football